Goran Bregović's Karmen with a Happy End is a concept album by Goran Bregović. It was composed in 2004.

Track listing

Uvertira
Gas Gas
Savatone
Mashala Mashala
Dikh Mo Vast
Pampur Galbeno
Stop
Ne Siam Kurve Tuke Sijam Prostitutke
Lumia Sitoj I Gurumni
Soske Murseske Manglape Kurva
Focu di Raggia
Me Sam Devla Romani
Koferi
Bijav
Lamour

References

2007 albums
Goran Bregović albums
Mercury Records albums